Kurt Bernard Simpson (born December 8, 1977) is a Costa Rican former professional footballer. He last played for Limón F.C. and was the top scorer in the Costa Rican league in 2005-2006.

Club career
He started his career with hometown club Limonense and later played for Santos de Guápiles,  Herediano, Puntarenas, before rejoining his first club, the renamed Limón.

He is the only player who is the all-time club top goalscorer of two different teams in Costa Rica, scoring 40 for Puntarenas and 57 for Limon as of September 2013. By November 2013, he had scored 117 goals in the Costa Rican Premier Division.

International career
Bernard made his debut for Costa Rica in a February 2006 friendly match against South Korea and has earned a total of 10 caps, scoring 1 goal. He has represented his country at the 2006 FIFA World Cup and played at the 2007 UNCAF Nations Cup.

His final international was a February 2007 UNCAF Nations Cup match against Panama.

International goals
Scores and results list Costa Rica's goal tally first.

References

External links

 Kurt Bernard profile - Nacion.com

1977 births
Living people
People from Limón Province
Association football forwards
Costa Rican footballers
Costa Rica international footballers
Costa Rican people of Jamaican descent
2006 FIFA World Cup players
2007 UNCAF Nations Cup players
Santos de Guápiles footballers
C.S. Herediano footballers
Puntarenas F.C. players
Copa Centroamericana-winning players